Serrallés may refer to:

 Castillo Serrallés, a mansion in Ponce, Puerto Rico, now a sugar cane history museum
 Destilería Serrallés, a distillery in Mercedita, Puerto Rico, makers of Don Q rums
 Juan Serrallés Colón, founder of Hacienda Mercedita, and Destilería Serrallés